Anderson Township may refer to:

Illinois
 Anderson Township, Clark County, Illinois

Indiana
 Anderson Township, Madison County, Indiana
 Anderson Township, Perry County, Indiana
 Anderson Township, Rush County, Indiana
 Anderson Township, Warrick County, Indiana

Iowa
 Anderson Township, Mills County, Iowa

Missouri
 Anderson Township, New Madrid County, Missouri, in Caswell County, North Carolina

Nebraska
 Anderson Township, Phelps County, Nebraska
 Anderson Township, Thurston County, Nebraska

North Carolina
 Anderson Township, Caswell County, North Carolina

North Dakota
 Anderson Township, Barnes County, North Dakota

Ohio
 Anderson Township, Hamilton County, Ohio

South Dakota
 Anderson Township, Perkins County, South Dakota

Township name disambiguation pages